Sir John Emanuel Mackey (7 August 1863 – 6 April 1924) was an Australian politician.
Mackey was born in Sandhurst to horse dealer David Mackey and Mary Ann Moore. He was largely self-educated, with only a brief and late formal education. He worked at a printery in Bendigo and then as a compositor for Mason, Firth and McCutcheon, a Melbourne law firm. He studied law at the University of Melbourne, receiving a Bachelor of Law and a Master of Arts. In 1890 he was called to the bar, and he was also a lecturer at Melbourne University. In 1902 he married Stella Watson Bates, with whom he had five children. 

Mackey was elected to the Victorian Legislative Assembly in 1902 for Gippsland West, and soon entered the ministry as a minister without portfolio in 1904. From 1906 he was Minister of Lands; he was also briefly Chief Secretary and Minister of Labour from 1906 to 1907 before taking up these roles again in 1908. From February to September 1908 he was Solicitor-General of Victoria. A Liberal and a member of the Nationalist Party's Economy faction, he was Speaker of the Assembly from 1917 to 1924. Knighted in 1921, he died at Nayook in 1924.

References

 

1863 births
1924 deaths
Nationalist Party of Australia members of the Parliament of Victoria
Members of the Victorian Legislative Assembly
Speakers of the Victorian Legislative Assembly
Solicitors-General of Victoria
Australian Knights Bachelor